Finch is an EP by American five-piece indie rock band Murder by Death.   Although the band's fourth album, 2008's Red of Tooth and Claw, was released on the Vagrant label, Finch's October 7, 2009 release was on Tent Show Records, Murder by Death's record label in the EastWest family of labels.

Album information
The album is an instrumental soundtrack to the book of the same name by author Jeff Vandermeer.  The band's website includes this description of the album:
This album is an instrumental soundtrack to a book called "Finch" by science fiction/fantasy/horror author Jeff VanderMeer.  Jeff approached MbD about doing a soundtrack to go with the limited edition of his new book, and we thought it was such a strange idea we had to do it. The book reminds us of "Blade Runner" - with spore-faced bad guys. Bitchin'. We locked ourselves up in our friends studio (Farm Fresh) in Bloomington, Indiana for 5 days and wrote and recorded an instrumental album inspired by the book. We have used a lot of crazy techniques that we have never tried before on this record. Our old pianist Vincent Edwards lent his hand(s) at the piano, organs, and Rhodes. Each song is attempting to recreate a scene or mood from the book.

Track listing

References

2009 albums
Concept albums
Murder by Death (band) albums